High Glow is the second studio album by American musician Jes, and was released on March 16, 2010.

Track listing

References

2010 albums
Jes (musician) albums
Black Hole Recordings albums